Bugulella is a genus of bryozoans belonging to the family Bugulidae.

The species of this genus are found in Southern Hemisphere.

Species:

Bugulella elegans 
Bugulella fragilis 
Bugulella gracilis 
Bugulella klugei 
Bugulella problematica 
Bugulella sinica

References

External links

Bryozoan genera